Maittanpatti is a small village in kalligudi Taluk of Madurai district in the Indian state of Tamil Nadu.

Geography
The latitude and longitude of this town is 9°40’ N and 77°57’E respectively.

Demographics
According to 2011 census, Maittanpatti had a population of 1,629 with a sex-ratio of 823 female to 806 male.

Transportation
Bus number 13  provides 2 trips to Virudhunagar and 4 trips to Tirumangalam, Madurai, daily. Bus number 48PM provides 3 trips daily to Madurai Periyar Bus Stand.

Educational institutions
Panchayat Union Primary School caters education for children studying in standard I to V. 
The Kamaraj College of Engineering and Technology is also located in Maittanpatti, along Madurai-Virudhunagar National Highway NH-7.

References

External links 
 Thirumangalam Website

Villages in Madurai district